Nello Matías Sosa (born February 26, 1992 in Neuquén) is an Argentine football player who plays for Cipolletti.

International career
In 2009 Sosa played with the Argentina Under-17 at the 2009 FIFA World Cup in Nigeria.

External links
 Profile at BDFA
 

1992 births
Living people
Argentine footballers
Argentine expatriate footballers
Association football midfielders
Expatriate footballers in Spain
Expatriate footballers in Uruguay
Boston River players
Club Nacional de Football players
Club Atlético River Plate (Montevideo) players
Sporting de Gijón B players
America Football Club (RJ) players
People from Neuquén